The Hong Kong Cup is a Group 1 flat horse race in Hong Kong which is open to thoroughbreds aged three years or older. It is run over a distance of 2000 metres (about  miles or 10 furlongs) at Sha Tin, and it is scheduled to take place each year in mid December.

The race was first run on 24 January 1988, and its distance was initially set at 1800 metres. The inaugural running was restricted to horses trained in Hong Kong, Malaysia and Singapore. Added to this list for the following season were horses from Australia and New Zealand. The race was switched to December for its third running, therefore taking place twice within 1989. Horses trained in Europe were admitted in 1990, followed by those from the United States in 1991, and Canada and Japan in 1992. The distance was increased to its present length, 2,000 metres, in 1999. Also at this time the race was promoted to Group 1 status.

The Hong Kong Cup is one of the four Hong Kong International Races, and it presently offers a purse of HK$34,000,000 in 2022-23 (approximately US$4.3 million), making it not just the richest race in Hong Kong but also the richest 2000 metre Turf race in the world.

Records
Speed record: (at present distance of 2,000 metres)
 1:59.70 – Romantic Warrior (2022)

Most wins:
 2 – California Memory (2011,2012)

Most wins by a jockey:
 3 – Frankie Dettori (2000, 2003, 2007)

Most wins by a trainer:
 3 – Anthony S. Cruz (2011, 2012, 2017)

Most wins by an owner:
 2 – Godolphin (2000, 2007), Howard Liang Yum Shing (2011,2012)

Winners

 The "1992" race actually took place in April 1993 – it had been postponed in December due to an equine virus.

See also
 List of Hong Kong horse races

References
Racing Post:
 Racing Information of Cathay Pacific Hong Kong Cup (2011/12)
 Website of Cathay Pacific Hong Kong Cup (2011/12)
 The Hong Kong Jockey Club
 horseracingintfed.com – International Federation of Horseracing Authorities – Hong Kong Cup (2016).
 pedigreequery.com – Hong Kong Cup – Sha Tin.

Open middle distance horse races
Horse races in Hong Kong
Recurring sporting events established in 1988
1988 establishments in Hong Kong